"Resurrection" is a song by Canadian alternative rock group Moist. It was released in December 1996 as the second single from their second studio album, Creature. It is the band's second highest charted single ever in Canada, reaching number 8 on Canada's RPM Singles Chart and number 4 on the Alternative chart in 1997.

Reception
Billboard reviewed the song favourably, calling it "a killer slice of pop-injected angst". They went on to say that it is "as lyrically intelligent as it is sonically striking".

Charts

References

External links

Lyrics of this song - Resurrection

1996 singles
Moist (Canadian band) songs
1996 songs
EMI Records singles